Eddy Portnoy is an expert on Jewish popular culture. Portnoy earned an MA in Yiddish Studies from Columbia University and a PhD in Jewish History from the Jewish Theological Seminary of America, and currently holds the position of Senior Researcher and Exhibition Curator at YIVO, as well as YIVO’s Academic Advisor for the Max Weinreich Center. Portnoy is considered Chełm's leading expert on Yiddish humor.

Exhibitions he has created have been praised in major media outlets, and his articles on Jewish popular culture have been published in The Drama Review, Polin, and The International Journal of Comic Art. Portnoy is also a contributing editor of The Forward and Tablet Magazine.

Portnoy is the author of the bestselling book Bad Rabbi And Other Strange but True Stories from the Yiddish Press (2017, Stanford University Press). This book covers overlooked aspects of American and Polish Jewish society and culture, namely, the life of marginalized people, "the downwardly mobile Jews" based on the stories published in Yiddish newspapers of New York City and Warsaw As Jack Fischel writes in his review, "He [Portnoy]  admits that the stories are not representative of Jewry, but insists that in every society there is a group of people who are lowly, uncultured, uneducated, poor, and worthy of attention." The book is based on Portnoy's Ph.D. on cartoons in the early Yiddish press. The New York Times praised Bad Rabbi as "The Good Kind of Schmaltz," adding that the book contains "a succession of outlandish misadventures, a wild panorama populated by an astonishing array of characters."

References

Year of birth missing (living people)
Living people
Jewish American writers
Jewish culture
Columbia University alumni
21st-century American Jews